The Lenstra–Lenstra–Lovász (LLL) lattice basis reduction algorithm is a polynomial time lattice reduction algorithm invented by Arjen Lenstra, Hendrik Lenstra and László Lovász in 1982.

The original applications were to give polynomial-time algorithms for factorizing polynomials with rational coefficients, for finding simultaneous rational approximations to real numbers, and for solving the integer linear programming problem in fixed dimensions.

LLL reduction
The precise definition of LLL-reduced is as follows: Given a basis

define its Gram–Schmidt process orthogonal basis

and the Gram-Schmidt coefficients
 for any .

Then the basis  is LLL-reduced if there exists a parameter  in  such that the following holds:

 (size-reduced) For . By definition, this property guarantees the length reduction of the ordered basis.
  (Lovász condition) For k = 2,3,..,n .

Here, estimating the value of the  parameter, we can conclude how well the basis is reduced. Greater values of  lead to stronger reductions of the basis.

The LLL algorithm computes LLL-reduced bases. There is no known efficient algorithm to compute a basis in which the basis vectors are as short as possible for lattices of dimensions greater than 4. However, an LLL-reduced basis is nearly as short as possible, in the sense that there are absolute bounds  such that the first basis vector is no more than  times as long as a shortest vector in the lattice,
the second basis vector is likewise within  of the second successive minimum, and so on.

Applications
An early successful application of the LLL algorithm was its use by Andrew Odlyzko and Herman te Riele in disproving Mertens conjecture.

The LLL algorithm has found numerous other applications in MIMO detection algorithms and cryptanalysis of public-key encryption schemes: knapsack cryptosystems, RSA with particular settings, NTRUEncrypt, and so forth. The algorithm can be used to find integer solutions to many problems.

In particular, the LLL algorithm forms a core of one of the integer relation algorithms. Thus the first three entries of this short vector are likely to be the coefficients of the integral quadratic polynomial which has r as a root. In this example the LLL algorithm finds the shortest vector to be [1, -1, -1, 0.00025] and indeed  has a root equal to the golden ratio, 1.6180339887....

Properties of LLL-reduced basis
Let  be a -LLL-reduced basis of a lattice .

 The first vector in the basis cannot be much larger than the shortest non-zero vector: .
 The first vector in the basis is also bounded by the determinant of the lattice: .
 The product of the norms of the vectors in the basis cannot be much larger than the determinant of the lattice: let , then  .

LLL algorithm pseudocode

 INPUT
     a lattice basis b0, b1, ..., bn in Zm
     a parameter δ with 1/4 < δ < 1, most commonly δ = 3/4
 PROCEDURE
     B* <- GramSchmidt({b0, ..., bn}) = {b0*, ..., bn*};  and do not normalize
     μi,j <- InnerProduct(bi, bj*)/InnerProduct(bj*, bj*);   using the most current values of bi and bj*
     k <- 1;
     while k <= n do
         for j from k−1 to 0 do
             if |μk,j| > 1/2 then
                 bk <- bk − ⌊μk,j⌉bj;
                Update B* and the related μi,j's as needed.
                (The naive method is to recompute B* whenever bi changes:
                 B* <- GramSchmidt({b0, ..., bn}) = {b0*, ..., bn*})
             end if
         end for
         if InnerProduct(bk*, bk*) > (δ − μ2k,k−1) InnerProduct(bk−1*, bk−1*) then
             k <- k + 1;
         else
             Swap bk and  bk−1;
             Update B* and the related μi,j's as needed.
             k <- max(k−1, 1);
         end if
     end while
     return B the LLL reduced basis of {b0, ..., bn}
 OUTPUT
     the reduced basis b0, b1, ..., bn in Zm

Examples

Example from Z3 

Let a lattice basis , be given by the columns of

then the reduced basis is 

which is size-reduced, satisfies the Lovász condition, and is hence LLL-reduced, as described above. See W. Bosma. for details of the reduction process.

Example from Z[i]4 
Likewise, for the basis over the complex integers given by the columns of the matrix below,

then the columns of the matrix below give an LLL-reduced basis.

Implementations
LLL is implemented in
Arageli as the function lll_reduction_int
fpLLL as a stand-alone implementation
FLINT as the function fmpz_lll
GAP as the function LLLReducedBasis
Macaulay2 as the function LLL in the package LLLBases
Magma as the functions LLL and LLLGram (taking a gram matrix)
Maple as the function IntegerRelations[LLL]
Mathematica as the function LatticeReduce
Number Theory Library (NTL) as the function LLL
PARI/GP as the function qflll
Pymatgen as the function analysis.get_lll_reduced_lattice
SageMath as the method LLL driven by fpLLL and NTL
Isabelle/HOL in the 'archive of formal proofs' entry LLL_Basis_Reduction. This code exports to efficiently executable Haskell.

See also
Coppersmith method

Notes

References
 
 
 
 
 

Theory of cryptography
Computational number theory
Lattice points